The Valley Queen Mill is an historic mill at 200 Providence Street in West Warwick, Rhode Island.

It is a five-story L-shaped stone building built in 1834 by the Greene Company.  The mill is the oldest of the three mill buildings in the area. It originally operated as a cotton factory, producing coarse cotton cloths under the Greene Company name.

In 1888, B.B.& R. Knight Company, the textile giant that made Fruit of the Loom products, purchased the Valley Queen Mill, and enlarged the plant. B.B &.R. Knight was a complete textile operation with combing, spinning and weaving facilities.

In 1931, the McIver Family, which owned The Original Bradford Soap Works, bought the Valley Queen Mill after B.B. & R Knight Company went bankrupt. In the 1960s, the Howland Family took over the business. Under the leadership of the Howland family, today Bradford Soap Works manufactures high quality bar soaps and soap bases in the Valley Queen Mill building.

The mill was listed on the National Register of Historic Places in 1984.

See also
National Register of Historic Places listings in Kent County, Rhode Island

References

Industrial buildings completed in 1834
Buildings and structures in West Warwick, Rhode Island
Industrial buildings and structures on the National Register of Historic Places in Rhode Island
National Register of Historic Places in Kent County, Rhode Island